Viscount Chaplin, of Saint Oswald's, Blankney, in the County of Lincoln, was a title in the Peerage of the United Kingdom. It was created in 1916 for Henry Chaplin, who was a Conservative MP, cabinet minister, country landowner and racehorse owner. The title became extinct upon the death of his grandson, the third Viscount, in 1981.

The Chaplin family descended from Sir Francis Chaplin, Lord Mayor of London from 1677 to 1678. Sir Francis was the father of Robert Chaplin, who was created a baronet in 1715 (see Chaplin baronets), and John Chaplin, ancestor of the Viscounts Chaplin.

Edith Chaplin, daughter of the first Viscount, married Charles Vane-Tempest-Stewart, 7th Marquess of Londonderry, and became a well-known socialite and philanthropist. Edward Chaplin, younger brother of the first Viscount, was also a politician.

Viscounts Chaplin (1916)
Henry Chaplin, 1st Viscount Chaplin (1840–1923)
Eric Chaplin, 2nd Viscount Chaplin (1877–1949)
Anthony Freskyn Charles Hamby Chaplin, 3rd Viscount Chaplin (1906–1981)

See also
Chaplin baronets

References
Notes

Sources

Extinct viscountcies in the Peerage of the United Kingdom
Noble titles created in 1916
Noble titles created for UK MPs